Mount Monson is at  the highest summit in the Mackay Mountains of Antarctica, situated  northeast of Vivian Nunatak in the southwest part of the group, in the Ford Ranges of Marie Byrd Land. It was mapped by the United States Antarctic Service (1939–41) and by the United States Geological Survey from surveys and U.S. Navy air photos (1959–65). It was named by the Advisory Committee on Antarctic Names for Lieutenant Laurence C. Monson III, U.S. Navy Reserve, co-pilot of LC-130F Hercules aircraft during Operation Deep Freeze 1968.

References

Mountains of Marie Byrd Land